Day of Rage: How Trump Supporters Took the U.S. Capitol is a 2021 American documentary short film about the January 6 Capitol attack caused by supporters of former president Donald Trump, reported by The New York Times.

Summary
The film is a six-month investigation of these events using videos posted on social media by the rioters themselves, police bodycam footage and archived audio from police communications alongside news coverage.

Reception
The film received positive reviews. It was shortlisted for the Academy Award for Best Documentary Short Subject. The video had earned 68,000 comments on YouTube.

The video also won the prestigious Alfred I. duPont–Columbia University Award and Peabody Award.

It was nominated for two News & Documentary Emmy Awards the following year.

See also
QAnon
Four Hours at the Capitol

References

External links

The New York Times
Official YouTube video

2021 short documentary films
Multimedia productions about the January 6 United States Capitol attack
Collage film
American short documentary films
2021 films
Collage television
2021 YouTube videos
Peabody Award-winning broadcasts
Works originally published in The New York Times
2020s English-language films
2020s American films